An adenosine receptor antagonist is a drug which acts as an antagonist of one or more of the adenosine receptors. The best known are xanthines and their derivatives (natural: caffeine, theophylline, and theobromine; and synthetic: PSB-1901), but there are also non-xanthine representatives (e.g. ISAM-140, ISAM-R316, Etrumadenant, and AZD-4635)

See also
 Adenosine receptor agonist
 Adenosine reuptake inhibitor

References

Drugs acting on the nervous system